was a village located in Hamamasu District, Ishikari Subprefecture, Hokkaido, Japan.

In 2004 the village had an estimated population of 2,179 and a density of 7.00 persons per km2. The total area was 311.16 km2.

On October 1, 2005, Hamamasu, along with the village of Atsuta (from Atsuta District) was merged into the expanded city of Ishikari.

Climate

References

See also
 Hamamasu District, Hokkaido

Dissolved municipalities of Hokkaido
Ishikari, Hokkaido